Pogorzelice  is a PKP railway station in Pogorzelice (Pomeranian Voivodeship), Poland.

Lines crossing the station

Train services
The station is served by the following services:

Regional services (R) Tczew — Słupsk  
Regional services (R) Malbork — Słupsk  
Regional services (R) Elbląg — Słupsk  
Regional services (R) Słupsk — Bydgoszcz Główna 
Regional services (R) Słupsk — Gdynia Główna

References 

Railway stations in Pomeranian Voivodeship